Martin Durkin may refer to:
* Martin Patrick Durkin (1894–1955), American politician
 Martin Durkin (director), British television producer
 Martin James Durkin (1900–1981), American criminal